Prince Chitcharoen, the Prince Narisara Nuwattiwong (28 April 1863 – 10 March 1947), Prince Naris for short, né Chitcharoen, was a member of the royal family of Siam (now Thailand), minister, general and scholar. A polymath, he became known as "the great craftsman of Siam" and "the prince master". The anniversary of his birth, 28 April, is celebrated in Thailand as "Prince Naris Day".

Early life
Prince Narisara Nuwattiwong was born on 28 April 1863 in Bangkok, Thailand. He was the son of Pannarai and King Rama IV (also known as King Mongkut). Prince Nuwattiwong was educated by Western missionaries who encouraged his interest in the fine arts.

Career

Government
Prince Narisara Nuwattiwong was appointed as the Director of Public Works, Town and Country Planning for the Ministry of the Interior. He worked on Thailand's early urban planning and became an Art Advisor for the Royal Institute of Thailand. His other jobs included working for the Ministry of the Treasury, the Ministry of War, and the Ministry of the Palace. From 1892 to 1894, he served as Minister of the Treasury.

From 1894 to 1899, he was the Minister of War. During his tenure, the former Kalahom department (dating back to the 15th century) was radically modernised based on Western models. From 1896 to 1899, Prince Naris—who was both a general of the army and an admiral—additionally held the position of the Commander of the Department of Military Operation, the highest military position in the Siamese Army of that time. From 1898 to 1899 he was also the Commander of the Navy Department and therefore commanding officer of the Siamese Navy.

Prince Naris served as Regent of Siam from 1934 to 1935, substituting for his nephew King Prajadhipok (Rama VII) who resided in England during the treatment of an eye condition. After Prajadhipok's definite abdication in 1935 and the choice of 9-year-old Ananda Mahidol as the new king, Naris declined the request to continue as regent, pointing to his old age.

Design 
When Prince Naris began his art endeavours, there was no Siamese concept of design. Thailand had no art museum, and the arts were not taught at universities. Prince Naris worked with Siamese craftsmen and Italian artists on royal commissions to create Siamese "art".

As Thailand began to modernize, it created its first European-style government ministries. Narisara was assigned to design the crest for these newly created ministries. Each crest he designed was different, representing the role of each group.

Architecture 

Wat Benchamabophit (the Marble Temple) was the first temple in Thailand to use marble in its construction. This temple has been described as a defining example of a modern Buddhist temple by the Western Ministries of Architecture.

The Wat Benchamabophit School is next to Wat Benjamabophit. Unlike the temple, the school was built in Western style. Phraubosotwatrachativas is another temple made of marble, but the style of this building combines Western and Thai styles. The temple contains oil paintings that were inspired by art found in Western medieval churches.

Music 
 "Sansoen Phra Barami" or Royal Anthem
 "Khamen Sai Yok"

Family
Prince Naris was married three times. His first wife was Mom Rachavongse Pluem Sirivongse (หม่อมราชวงศ์ปลื้ม ศิริวงศ์), with whom he had one daughter:
 Prince Pluemchit Chitrabongse (หม่อมเจ้าปลื้มจิต จิตรพงศ์)

After the death of his first wife, Prince Naris married Mom Malai Chitrabongse Na Ayudhaya (née Sewatam) (หม่อมมาลัย เศวตามร์), with whom he had two sons:
 Prince Ai Chitrabongse (หม่อมเจ้าอ้าย จิตรพงศ์)
 Prince Charoenchai Chitrabongse (หม่อมเจ้าเจริญใจ จิตรพงศ์)

After the death of his second wife, the prince remarried one last time, marrying Mom Rachavongse To Ngon-rot (หม่อมราชวงศ์โต งอนรถ). They had a total of six children, of whom five were male:
 Prince Sam Chitrabongse (หม่อมเจ้าสาม จิตรพงศ์)
 Princess Pralomchit Chitrabongse (หม่อมเจ้าประโลมจิตร จิตรพงศ์)
 Princess Duangchit Chitrabongse (หม่อมเจ้าดวงจิตร จิตรพงศ์)
 Prince Yachai Chitrabongse (หม่อมเจ้ายาใจ จิตรพงศ์)
 Prince Phlao-rot Chitrabongse (หม่อมเจ้าเพลารถ จิตรพงศ์)
 Princess Konnika Chitrabongse (หม่อมเจ้าหญิงกรณิกา จิตรพงศ์)

Official title
His official title was "สมเด็จพระเจ้าบรมวงศ์เธอ เจ้าฟ้าจิตรเจริญ กรมพระยานริศรานุวัดติวงศ์" (Somdet Phra Chao Boromma Wong Thoe Chao Fa Chitcharoen Krom Phraya Naritsaranuwattiwong), which can be translated as "His Royal Highness Prince Chitcharoen, the Prince Narisara Nuwattiwong".

His full ceremonial title (before he was promoted to the rank of "Krom Phraya") was "สมเด็จพระเจ้าบรมวงศ์เธอ เจ้าฟ้ากรมพระนริศรานุวัดติวงศ์ มหามกุฏพงศ์นฤบดินทร ปรมินทรานุชาธิเบนทร์ ปรเมนทรราชปิตุลา สวามิภักดิ์สยามวิชิต สรรพศิลปสิทธิวิทยาธร สุรจิตรกรศุภโกศล ประพนธปรีชาชาญโบราณคดี สังคีตวาทิตวิธีวิจารณ์ มโหฬารสีตลัธยาศรัย พุทธาทิไตรรัตนสรณานุวัติ ขัตติยเดชานุภาพบพิตร" ("Somdet Phra Chao Boromma Wong Thoe, Chao Fa Kromma Phra Naritsaranuwattiwong, Maha Makutta Phong Narue Bodin, Paraminthranuchathiben, Paramen Ratcha Pitula, Sawamiphak Sayama Wichit, Sappha Sinlapa Sit Witthaya Thon, Sura Chittra Kon Suppha Koson, Praphontha Pricha Chan Boranna Khadi, Sangkhita Wathit Withi Wichan, Maholan Sitalatthayasai, Phutthathi Trai Rat Sarananuwat, Khattiya Dechanuphap Bophit").

Death
Naris died on 10 March 1947 from a stroke. His funeral was held publicly at Sanam Luang. His cremation pyre was similar to the royal funeral pyre of Ananda Mahidol.

References

Further reading

External links
The Prince Narisara Nuvadtivongs

|-

|-

Thai male Chao Fa
Chitrabhongse family
19th-century Chakri dynasty
20th-century Chakri dynasty
Thai artists
Regents of Thailand
Ministers of Defence of Thailand
Knights Grand Cordon of the Order of Chula Chom Klao
Knights of the Ratana Varabhorn Order of Merit
Recipients of the Dushdi Mala Medal, Pin of Arts and Science
1863 births
1947 deaths
Thai male Phra Ong Chao
Children of Mongkut
Commanders-in-chief of the Royal Thai Army
Ministers of Finance of Thailand
Ministers of Transport of Thailand
Members of the Privy Council of Thailand
19th-century military history of Thailand
Sons of kings